The Elizabeth Resolutes were a 19th-century professional baseball team based in Elizabeth, New Jersey. They were a member of the National Association of Professional Base Ball Players for the 1873 season, and played their home games at Waverly Fairgrounds. Though based in the vicinity of Elizabeth, they were usually listed in game reports as simply "Resolute" or "the Resolutes", per the style of the day. "Elizabeth Resolutes" is modern nomenclature.

The Resolutes were an amateur team dating back to the mid-1860s, and became one of a number of teams to try their hand at professional ball. The club played just 23 games during its lone professional season, finishing with two victories against 21 defeats, and losing all eight of their home games.  Hugh Campbell was the pitcher of record for both wins and 16 of the losses.  The Resolutes' leading hitter was Art Allison, who batted .323, his best season, while playing all 23 games, mostly in the outfield.

Although Philadelphia and New York City teams occasionally played games in New Jersey to circumvent blue laws that forbid professional baseball on Sundays, the Resolutes and the 1915 Newark Peppers of the Federal League are the only "major league" teams to be based in New Jersey.

See also
1873 Elizabeth Resolutes season

External links
Resolutes stats at baseball-reference.com

Further reading
Wright, Marshall (2000). The National Association of Base Ball Players, 1857-1870. Jefferson, NC: McFarland & Co. 

National Association of Base Ball Players teams
Defunct National Association baseball teams
Baseball teams disestablished in 1873
Elizabeth, New Jersey
1873 in sports in New Jersey
Baseball in New Jersey
Defunct baseball teams in New Jersey
Sports clubs established in 1873